Johann Friedrich Agricola (4 January 1720 – 2 December 1774) was a German composer, organist, singer, pedagogue, and writer on music. He sometimes wrote under the pseudonym Flavio Anicio Olibrio.

Biography
Agricola was born in Dobitschen, Thuringia.

Leipzig
While a student of law at Leipzig (1738–41) he studied music under Johann Sebastian Bach.

Berlin
In 1741 Agricola went to Berlin, where he studied musical composition under Johann Joachim Quantz. He was soon generally recognized as one of the most skillful organists of his time. The success of his comic opera, Il filosofo convinto in amore, performed at Potsdam in 1750, led to an appointment as court composer to Frederick the Great. In 1759, on the death of Carl Heinrich Graun, he was appointed conductor of the royal orchestra.  He married the noted court operatic soprano Benedetta Emilia Molteni, despite the king's prohibition of court employees marrying each other. Because of this trespass, the king reduced Molteni's and Agricola's combined salaries to a single annual salary of 1,000 Thalers (Agricola's annual salary alone had been 1,500 Thalers). Agricola died in Berlin at age 54.

Legacy
Agricola wrote a number of Italian operas, as well as Lieder, chorale preludes, various other keyboard pieces and church music, especially oratorios and cantatas. His reputation chiefly rests, however, on his theoretical and critical writings on musical subjects.

Author
In 1754 he co-authored, with Carl Philipp Emanuel Bach, J. S. Bach's obituary. His 1757 Anleitung zur Singekunst (Introduction to the Art of Singing) is a translation of Pier Francesco Tosi's 1723 treatise Opinioni de' cantori antichi e moderni with Agricola's own extensive comments. He edited and added extensive commentary to the 1768 (posthumous) edition of Jakob Adlung's Musica mechanica organoedi (English translation). His annotations are considered an important source of information on J. S. Bach's views on the fortepiano designs of Gottfried Silbermann, on the lute-harpsichord, and on organ building.

Copyist
Agricola is also noted in Bach studies as one of the copyists for both books of the Well-Tempered Clavier and the St. Matthew Passion.

Composer

Keyboard
Ach, was soll ich Sünder machen
Jauchzet, ihr Erlösten dem Herren
Harpsichord Sonata in F major

Organ
Jesu, meine Freude
Ein feste Burg ist unser Gott
Auf meinen lieben Gott
Erbarm dich mein, o Herre Gott
Es ist das Heil uns kommen her
Jauchzt, ihr Erlösten, dem Herren
O Ewigkeit, du Donnerwort
Herr, ich habe mißgehandelt
Herr Jesu Christ, ich weiß gar wohl
Wer nur den lieben Gott läßt walten
Ach, was soll ich Sünder machen
O Traurigkeit, o Herzeleid
Keinen hat Gott verlassen
Herzliebster Jesu, was hast du verbrochen
Freu dich sehr, o meine Seele
Ich hab mein Sach Gott heimgestellt

Chamber works
Flute Sonata in A major

Vocal works
A la mignonne de fortune (song)
L'accorto nocchiero (aria)
Canzonetta, Les Rois d'Égypte
6 Canzonettes
Cleofide
 Torna aprile e l'aure scherzano (aria)

Choral works
Die Hirten bei der Krippe, cantata for 4 voices, chorus & orchestra
Kündlich gross ist das gottselige Geheimnis, cantata for 4 voices, chorus & orchestra
Uns ist ein Kind geboren, cantata for 4 voices, chorus & orchestra
 Die Hirten bey der Krippe zu Bethlehem, sacred cantata
 Der König jauchzt, sacred cantata
 Il tempio d'amore, serenata
 Magnificat in D major

Opera
Alessandro nell'Indie (1754)
Achille in Sciro, (1765)
 L'Ippocondriaco

References

Attribution

External links

Agricola, Johann Friedrich at Bach Digital

1720 births
1774 deaths
People from Altenburger Land
German Classical-period composers
German male classical composers
People from Saxe-Gotha-Altenburg
Music directors of the Berlin State Opera
German music theorists
Pupils of Johann Sebastian Bach
18th-century classical composers
18th-century male musicians
18th-century musicians
18th-century conductors (music)
Writers about music